Qiu Menghuang (born 12 December 1968), also known as his stage name A Qiu, is a Chinese television presenter and blogger.

Qiu Menghuang was born in Shantou, Guangdong Province on 12 December 1968, his parents were both soldiers. Qiu's mother was a Returned Malaysian Chinese. He was admitted to Guangxi Teachers Training College (present-day Nanning Normal University), majoring political economy. After his graduation in 1989, he was assigned to Nanning Cotton Textile Printing and Dyeing Factory, as a political cadre of labor union. In 1992, he became a playwright in Nanning Art Theater.

Qiu joined China Central Television (CCTV) as a television presenter on 21 April, 2003. He had hosted several programs, including Society in the News, The Elite, and Daily stories.

In November 2019, there were rumors said that Qiu has been "expelled from CCTV and never be hired again". However, it was denied by him.

During the COVID-19 pandemic in China, on 26 February 2020, Qiu posted on Sina Weibo: "Even though the stereotype of 'sick man of Asia' has been shattered for over a century, can we be more gentle and apologetic in our tone, humbly put on some face masks and give a bow to the world and say 'sorry for the mess'?"  The tweet was subsequently deleted, however, many Chinese social media users accused Qiu of "betraying China" and "providing a moral basis for the global anti-Chinese behavior". On 4 March, CCTV announced that Qiu had been "completely banned from hosting shows".

References

1968 births
Living people
People from Shantou
Hakka people
CCTV television presenters